The Crosse Baronetcy, of Westminster, was a title in the Baronetage of Great Britain. The second Baronet represented Wootton Bassett, Lostwithiel and Westminster in Parliament.

Crosse baronets, of Westminster (1713)
Sir Thomas Crosse, 1st Baronet (1664–1738)
Sir John Crosse, 2nd Baronet (–1762)

References

Extinct baronetcies in the Baronetage of Great Britain
1713 establishments in Great Britain